5-Methoxytryptamine (5-MT), also known as mexamine, is a tryptamine derivative closely related to the neurotransmitters serotonin and melatonin. 5-MT has been shown to occur naturally in the body in low levels. It is biosynthesized via the deacetylation of melatonin in the pineal gland.

5-MT acts as a full agonist at the 5-HT1, 5-HT2, 5-HT4, 5-HT6, and 5-HT7 receptors. It has no affinity for the 5-HT3 receptor and its affinity for the 5-HT1E receptor is very weak in comparison to the other 5-HT1 receptors. Its affinity for the 5-HT5A receptor is unknown.

Measured affinity for some receptors (incomplete list):

 5-HT1B receptors  (Ki = 35 nM)  
 5-HT1D receptors  (Ki = 7.3 nM) 
 5-HT1E receptors  (Ki = 3151 nM) 
 5-HT1F receptors  (Ki = 1166 nM) 
 5-HT2A receptors  (Ki = 295 nM) 
 5-HT2B receptors (Ki = 16.4 nM) 
 5-HT2C receptors  (Ki = 52.48 nM)  
 5-HT4 receptors  (Ki = 501.18 nM) 
 5-HT6 receptors  (Ki = 69.18 nM) 
 5-HT7 receptors  (Ki = 5.01 nM)

See also

 2-Methyl-5-hydroxytryptamine
 5-Benzyloxytryptamine
 5-Carboxamidotryptamine
 α-Methyl-5-hydroxytryptamine

References

5-HT6 agonists
Serotonin receptor agonists
Mexamines